The 20805 / 20806 Andhra Pradesh Express  is a daily Superfast Express train that connects the national capital of India, to the  largest city of Andhra Pradesh, . The express is administered under Indian Railways's South Coast Railway Zone with the service numbers 20805 (Visakhapatnam to New Delhi) and 20806 (New Delhi to Visakhapatnam). The train service was first commissioned by then Railway Minister Suresh Prabhu on 12 August 2015 as Andhra Pradesh AC Express. Later in the year 2020 Non-AC Sleeper Coaches were attached to this train which renamed this train as Andhra Pradesh Express. When the Telangana state was bifurcated from Andhra Pradesh state, that train was renamed as Telangana Express and a new rake of LHB coach of Andhra Pradesh Express was started from Visakhapatnam.

Operations 
It is a train with LHB coach. The train runs daily, passing through the states of Uttar Pradesh, Madhya Pradesh, Maharashtra and Telangana, before reaching Andhra Pradesh. It has a single 1 AC first class coach, 5 AC 2 tier coaches, 7 AC 3 tier coaches, 6 Sleeper coaches, 1 AC pantry car and 2 guard cum generator cars. It starts from Visakhapatnam and reaches New Delhi by next day. Similarly, it starts from New Delhi and reaches Visakhapatnam on next day. Loco attached from Visakhapatnam to Vijayawada WAP-4 of Visakhapatnam/Vijayawada Shed or WAP-7 of Lallaguda/Visakhapatnam shed and Vijayawada shed to New Delhi WAP-4 or WAP-7 of Lallaguda/Ghaziabad shed.

Schedule

Train runs daily from both the sides from 23.1.2020 in a new schedule and new train number with Sleeper coaches . There will be total 4 LHB rakes are dedicated to this train.

Reversals

Old schedule
Train used to run daily as AP AC Express from both the sides till January 22, 2020. There were total 4 rakes which were dedicated to this train.

Route 

Traction

Both trains are hauled by a Visakhapatnam / Lallaguda /
Vijayawada based WAP-7 electric locomotive from end to end.

See also 
 List of named passenger trains of India

References 

Transport in Delhi
Transport in Visakhapatnam
Rail transport in Andhra Pradesh
Rail transport in Telangana
Rail transport in Maharashtra
Rail transport in Madhya Pradesh
Rail transport in Uttar Pradesh
Rail transport in Delhi
Railway services introduced in 2015